216th may refer to:

216th Battalion (Bantams), CEF, a unit in the Canadian Expeditionary Force during the First World War
216th Infantry Division (German), raised in 1939 in Hameln Lower Saxony from primarily Landwehr in the area around Hannover
216th Infantry Division (Germany), created on 26 August 1939 by reorganizing several Border Defense and Army Reserve units from Lower Saxony
216th Motor Rifle Division, a division of the Soviet Ground Forces
216th Infantry Brigade, a British Army Home Service formation during the First World War
216th Independent Infantry Brigade (Home) a British Army Home Service formation during the Second World War
CCXVI Field Brigade, Royal Field Artillery, a Territorial Force unit of the British Army during the First World War

See also
216 (number)
216, the year 216 (CCXVI) of the Julian calendar
216 BC